Terrance Hayes (born November 18, 1971) is an American poet and educator who has published seven poetry collections. His 2010 collection, Lighthead, won the National Book Award for Poetry in 2010. In September 2014, he was one of 21 recipients of a prestigious MacArthur Fellowship, awarded to individuals who show outstanding creativity in their work.

Life and education
Hayes was born in Columbia, South Carolina. He received a B.A. from Coker University and an M.F.A. from the University of Pittsburgh writing program. He was a Professor of Creative Writing at Carnegie Mellon University until 2013, at which time he joined the faculty at the English Department at the University of Pittsburgh. Currently, he teaches at New York University.

Hayes lives in Manhattan, and he and his ex-wife, the poet Yona Harvey, a professor at the University of Pittsburgh, share the custody of their two children.

Works
Hayes's first book of poetry, Muscular Music (1999), won both a Whiting Award and the Kate Tufts Discovery Award. His second collection, Hip Logic (2002), won the National Poetry Series, was a finalist for the Los Angeles Times Book Award, and runner-up for the James Laughlin Award from the Academy of American Poets. He won the National Book Award for  Lighthead (in which he invented the "golden shovel" poetic form).

Hayes's poems have appeared in literary journals and magazines including The New Yorker, The American Poetry Review, Ploughshares, Fence, The Kenyon Review, Jubilat, Harvard Review, West Branch, Poetry, and The Adroit Journal.In praising Hayes's work, Cornelius Eady has said: "First you'll marvel at his skill, his near-perfect pitch, his disarming humor, his brilliant turns of phrase. Then you'll notice the grace, the tenderness, the unblinking truth-telling just beneath his lines, the open and generous way he takes in our world."

In September 2014, he was honored as one of the 21 2014 fellows of the John D. and Catherine T. MacArthur Foundation.

In January 2017, Hayes was elected a Chancellor of the Academy of American Poets.

In 2018, Hayes premiered Cycles of My Being commissioned by Opera Philadelphia, Lyric Opera of Chicago, and Carnegie Hall with music by Tyshawn Sorey starring Lawrence Brownlee. This song cycles center on what it means to be a Black man living in America today. In 2020, the song cycle was made into a film by Opera Philadelphia and released on their digital channel. The poetry was from Hayes' book American Sonnets for My Past and Future Assassin.

Awards
 2020 Bobbitt National Prize for Poetry for American Sonnets for My Past and Future Assassin 2014 MacArthur Foundation Fellow
 2011 United States Artists Zell Fellow for Literature
 2010 National Book Award for Poetry, for Lighthead National Endowment for the Arts Fellowship
 2009 Guggenheim Fellowship
 Pushcart Prize, a Best American Poetry 2005 selection
 James Laughlin Award runner-up, from the Academy of American Poets
 2001 National Poetry Series, for Hip Logic Kate Tufts Discovery Award for Muscular Music'' (1999)
 1999 Whiting Award

Bibliography

Poetry 
Collections

 

 
 —winner of the National Book Award

List of poems

Nonfiction

References

External links

 
 Essays, poems, video of Terrance Hayes at Poets.org
 Profile and poems of Terrance Hayes, including audio files, at the Poetry Foundation.
 Video: Online NewsHour: Report > Pittsburgh Poet Terrance Hayes > April 24, 2008
 Interview: The Missouri Review > Issue 29.4, Winter 2006 > A Conversation with Terrance Hayes by Jason Koo
 
 
 Library of Congress Online Catalog > Terrance Hayes
 pabook.libraries > Terrance Hayes
 Profile at The Whiting Foundation

1971 births
Living people
20th-century American poets
21st-century American poets
American male poets
Carnegie Mellon University faculty
Coker University alumni
English-language poets
MacArthur Fellows
National Book Award winners
National Endowment for the Arts Fellows
Poets from Pennsylvania
Poets from South Carolina
The New Yorker people
University of Pittsburgh alumni
University of Pittsburgh faculty
Writers from Columbia, South Carolina
20th-century American male writers
21st-century American male writers